Bazhou (Mandarin: 巴州镇) is a town in Minhe Hui and Tu Autonomous County, Haidong, Qinghai, China. In 2010, Bazhou had a total population of 18,110: 9,129 males and 8,981 females: 4,359 aged under 14, 12,530 aged between 15 and 65 and 1,221 aged over 65.

References 
 

Township-level divisions of Qinghai
Haidong